This is a comprehensive list of victories of the  cycling team. The races are categorized according to the rules.

Sources:

2003
Tour du Grand Montréal, Amber Neben
Stage 2 Gracia–Orlová, Amber Neben
Stage 7 International Thüringen Rundfahrt der Frauen, Kimberly Bruckner Baldwin

2004
Stage 2 & 6 Tour de l'Aude Cycliste Féminin, Deidre Demet-Barry
Sparkassen Giro Bochum, Deidre Demet-Barry
Giro della Toscana Femminile – Memorial Michela Fanini, Deidre Demet-Barry

2005
Sea Otter Classic, Kristin Armstrong
Liberty Classic, Ina-Yoko Teutenberg
Stage 4a BrainWash Ladies Tour, Ina-Yoko Teutenberg
Lowland International Rotterdam Tour, Ina-Yoko Teutenberg

2006

Stage 4 Geelong Tour, Ina-Yoko Teutenberg
Overall Geelong – Women's World Cup, Ina-Yoko Teutenberg
Stage 1, Ina-Yoko Teutenberg
Stage 2 & 3 Tour of New Zealand, Ina-Yoko Teutenberg
Stage 1 Novilon Eurocup Ronde van Drenthe, Ina-Yoko Teutenberg
 Overall Gracia–Orlová, Judith Arndt
Stages 1, 2 & 4, Judith Arndt
Stage 5 & 10 Tour de l'Aude Cycliste Féminin, Ina-Yoko Teutenberg
La Coupe du Monde Cycliste Féminine de Montréal, Judith Arndt
Stage 4 Tour du Grand Montréal, Judith Arndt
Stage 4 Tour de Feminin – Krasna Lipa, Ina-Yoko Teutenberg
Stage 2 & 3 BrainWash Ladies Tour, Ina-Yoko Teutenberg
Stage 6 BrainWash Ladies Tour, Judith Arndt
Lowland International Rotterdam Tour, Ina-Yoko Teutenberg
Stage 3b Giro della Toscana Femminile – Memorial Michela Fanini, Ina-Yoko Teutenberg

2007

Stage 2 & 3 Geelong Tour, Ina-Yoko Teutenberg
Overall Tour of New Zealand, Judith Arndt
Stages 1 & 6 Tour of New Zealand, Ina-Yoko Teutenberg
Stages 2 & 3 Tour of New Zealand, Oenone Wood
Stage 4 Tour of New Zealand, Judith Arndt
 Overall Gracia–Orlová, Judith Arndt
Stages 2 & 3, Judith Arndt
Stage 6 Tour de l'Aude Cycliste Féminin, Linda Villumsen
Stage 8a Tour de l'Aude Cycliste Féminin, Judith Arndt
Stage 9 Tour de l'Aude Cycliste Féminin, Ina-Yoko Teutenberg
Overall Tour du Grand Montréal, Oenone Wood
Stage 3, Judith Arndt
Stage 4 & 5 Oenone Wood
Omloop Door Middag-Humsterland WE, Suzanne de Goede
Liberty Classic, Ina-Yoko Teutenberg
Stage 3 Rabobank Ster Zeeuwsche Eilanden, Ina-Yoko Teutenberg
Stages 4 & 7 Giro d'Italia Femminile, Ina-Yoko Teutenberg
Stage 6 Giro d'Italia Femminile, Judith Arndt
 Overall International Thüringen Rundfahrt der Frauen, Judith Arndt
Stage 4 Judith Arndt
Open de Suède Vårgårda, Chantal Beltman
Stages 4 & 5 Trophée d'Or Féminin, Ina-Yoko Teutenberg
Stage 2 BrainWash Ladies Tour, Judith Arndt
Stage 5 Giro della Toscana Femminile – Memorial Michela Fanini, Judith Arndt

2008

Stage 2 Geelong Tour, Oenone Wood
Stage 3 Geelong Tour, Ina-Yoko Teutenberg
Stages 2 & 4 Tour of New Zealand, Oenone Wood
Stage 6 Tour of New Zealand, Ina-Yoko Teutenberg
Ronde van Vlaanderen, Judith Arndt
Drentse 8 van Dwingeloo, Ina-Yoko Teutenberg
Ronde van Drenthe, Chantal Beltman
Stages 5 & 8 Tour de l'Aude Cycliste Féminin, Ina-Yoko Teutenberg
Stage 9 Tour de l'Aude Cycliste Féminin, Judith Arndt
La Coupe du Monde Cycliste Féminine de Montréal, Judith Arndt
Overall Tour du Grand Montréal, Judith Arndt
Stages 2, 3 & 5, Judith Arndt
Liberty Classic, Chantal Beltman
Overall  Rabobank Ster Zeeuwsche Eilanden, Ina-Yoko Teutenberg
Stages 2 & 3, Ina-Yoko Teutenberg
Stages 1, 2, 3 & 8 Giro d'Italia Femminile, Ina-Yoko Teutenberg
Stage 1 Tour de Feminin – Krasna Lipa, Mara Abbott
 Overall International Thüringen Rundfahrt der Frauen, Judith Arndt
 Overall Route de France Féminine, Luise Keller
Prologue & Stages 1 & 5, Ina-Yoko Teutenberg
Stages 3 & 6, Luise Keller
Stages 1, 4 & 6 BrainWash Ladies Tour, Ina-Yoko Teutenberg
Stage 3 BrainWash Ladies Tour, Anke Wichmann
Rund um die Nürnberger Altstadt – WE, Judith Arndt
 Overall Giro della Toscana Int. Femminile – Memorial Michela Fanini, Judith Arndt
Stages 2b & 4, Ina-Yoko Teutenberg
Stage 3, Mara Abbott
Stage 5, Judith Arndt
Merco Credit Union Cycling Classic Downtown Grand Prix, Emilia Fahlin

2009

Young rider Classification Ladies Tour of Qatar , Ellen van Dijk
Tour of Wellington, Chloe Hosking
Tour of Flanders for Women, Ina-Yoko Teutenberg
Drentse 8 van Dwingeloo, Ina-Yoko Teutenberg
Ronde van Gelderland, Ina-Yoko Teutenberg
Overall Tour of Chongming Island, Chloe Hosking
Stages 1 & 3, Chloe Hosking
Stage 4 Gracia–Orlová, Ina-Yoko Teutenberg
Prologue Tour de l'Aude Cycliste Féminin, Linda Villumsen
Stages 1, 3 & 9 Tour de l'Aude Cycliste Féminin, Ina-Yoko Teutenberg
Liberty Classic, Ina-Yoko Teutenberg
Overall Iurreta-Emakumeen, Judith Arndt
Stages 1, 3a & 4, Judith Arndt
Overall Rabobank Ster Zeeuwsche Eilanden, Ina-Yoko Teutenberg
Stage 1, Linda Villumsen
Stage 3 Giro d'Italia Femminile, Mara Abbott
Stage 4 Giro d'Italia Femminile, Ina-Yoko Teutenberg
Stage 6 Giro d'Italia Femminile, Judith Arndt
 Overall International Thüringen Rundfahrt der Frauen, Linda Villumsen
Stage 3, Linda Villumsen
 Overall Route de France Féminine, Kimberly Anderson
Stages 1 & 3, Ina-Yoko Teutenberg
Profronde van Almelo, Chantal Beltman
Stage 2 BrainWash Ladies Tour, Ellen van Dijk
Stage 5 BrainWash Ladies Tour, Ina-Yoko Teutenberg
Stage 5 Giro della Toscana Femminile – Memorial Michela Fanini, Ina-Yoko Teutenberg

2010

Drentse 8 van Dwingeloo, Ina-Yoko Teutenberg
 Overall Tour of Chongming Island, Ina-Yoko Teutenberg
Stages 1 & 3, Ina-Yoko Teutenberg
Tour of Chongming Island World Cup, Ina-Yoko Teutenberg
Stages 3, 6 & 9, Tour de l'Aude Cycliste Féminin Ina-Yoko Teutenberg
Liberty Classic, Ina-Yoko Teutenberg
Iurreta-Emakumeen, Judith Arndt
Chrono de Gatineau WE, Evelyn Stevens
Stage 2 Giro del Trentino Alto Adige – Südtirol, Ina-Yoko Teutenberg
Stages 1, 2, 3 & 4 Giro d'Italia Femminile, Ina-Yoko Teutenberg
Stage 7 Giro d'Italia Femminilem, Evelyn Stevens
Stage 3 International Thüringen Rundfahrt der Frauen, Adrie Visser
Sparkassen Giro Bochum, Ellen van Dijk
Stage 2 Route de France Féminine, Ina-Yoko Teutenberg
Stage 5 Route de France Féminine, Judith Arndt
Classica Citta di Padova, Noemi Cantele
Stage 1 BrainWash Ladies Tour, Ina-Yoko Teutenberg
Stage 6 BrainWash Ladies Tour, Ellen van Dijk
 Overall Giro della Toscana Int. Femminile – Memorial Michela Fanini, Judith Arndt
Stage 2, Noemi Cantele

2011

 Overall Ladies Tour of Qatar, Ellen van Dijk
 Young rider Classification Ladies, Ellen van Dijk
 Points classification Ladies, Ellen van Dijk
Stage 2, Ellen van Dijk
Overall Tour of New Zealand, Judith Arndt
Stages 1 & 2, Judith Arndt
Stage 3, Ina-Yoko Teutenberg
 Overall Energiewacht Tour, Adrie Visser
Stage 2, Ina-Yoko Teutenberg
Stage 3, Adrie Visser
Ronde van Gelderland, Ina-Yoko Teutenberg
GP Stad Roeselare, Amber Neben
 Overall Tour of Chongming Island, Ina-Yoko Teutenberg
Stage 2, Ina-Yoko Teutenberg
Stage 3, Chloe Hosking
Tour of Chongming Island World Cup, Ina-Yoko Teutenberg
 Overall Giro del Trentino Alto Adige – Südtirol, Judith Arndt
Stage 1, Ina-Yoko Teutenberg
Stage 2, Judith Arndt
Stages 4 & 10 Giro d'Italia Femminile, Ina-Yoko Teutenberg
Stage 1 International Thüringen Rundfahrt der Frauen, Ina-Yoko Teutenberg
Stage 3  International Thüringen Rundfahrt der Frauen, Amanda Miller
 Stage 5 International Thüringen Rundfahrt der Frauen, Judith Arndt
Sparkassen Giro Bochum, Adrie Visser
Stage 1 Trophée d'Or Féminin, Ina-Yoko Teutenberg
Stage 3 Trophée d'Or Féminin, Charlotte Becker
Memorial Davide Fardelli – Cronometro Individuale WE, Judith Arndt
Prologue & Stage 2, 5 & 6 Tour Cycliste Féminin International Ardèche, Emilia Fahlin
Stage 4 Tour Cycliste Féminin International Ardèche, Evelyn Stevens
Open de Suède Vårgårda TTT, Ellen van Dijk, Charlotte Becker, Amber Neben, Judith Arndt
Stage 2 Holland Ladies Tour, Ellen van Dijk
Chrono Champenois – Trophée Européen, Judith Arndt
Stages 2 & 4a Giro della Toscana Int. Femminile – Memorial Michela Fanini, Ina-Yoko Teutenberg
Stage 3 & 4b Giro della Toscana Int. Femminile – Memorial Michela Fanini, Judith Arndt
Stage 6 Giro della Toscana Int. Femminile – Memorial Michela Fanini, Charlotte Becker
Chrono des Nations, Amber Neben

2012

Stage 2  Ladies Tour of Qatar, Trixi Worrack
Overall Tour of New Zealand, Evelyn Stevens
Stage 2 Loren Rowney
Drentse 8 van Dwingeloo, Chloe Hosking
Panamerican Championships individual TT, Amber Neben
Stages 2 & 4 Vuelta Ciclista Femenina a El Salvador, Amber Neben
Stage 4b Energiewacht Tour, Ellen van Dijk, Ina-Yoko Teutenberg
 Overall Energiewacht Tour, Ina-Yoko Teutenberg
Stages 2 & 3, Ina-Yoko Teutenberg
Halle-Buizingen, Chloe Hosking
La Flèche Wallonne Féminine, Evelyn Stevens
Omloop van Borsele (road race), Ellen van Dijk
Omloop van Borsele (time trial), Ellen van Dijk
 Overall  Gracia–Orlová, Evelyn Stevens
Prologue & Stage 2, Ellen van Dijk
Stage 1, Evelyn Stevens
Stage 3, Trixi Worrack
Stage 4, Katie Colclough
Chrono de Gatineau, Clara Hughes
Grand Prix Cyclist de Gatineau, Ina-Yoko Teutenberg
Overall The Exergy Tour, Evelyn Stevens
Stage 2, Amber Neben
Stage 3, Ina-Yoko Teutenberg
Liberty Classic, Ina-Yoko Teutenberg
Stage 1 Iurreta-Emakumeen, Ina-Yoko Teutenberg
Stage 3 Giro d'Italia Femminile, Evelyn Stevens
Stages 1 & 2 International Thüringen Rundfahrt der Frauen, Ina-Yoko Teutenberg
Stages 3 & 4 International Thüringen Rundfahrt der Frauen, Trixi Worrack
 Overall Route de France Féminine, Evelyn Stevens
Stage 4, Chloe Hosking
Stage 5, Loren Rowney
Stages 6 & 8, Evelyn Stevens
Open de Suède Vårgårda TTT, Ellen van Dijk, Trixi Worrack, Evelyn Stevens, Ina-Yoko Teutenberg, Charlotte Becker, Amber Neben
 Overall Lotto–Decca Tour, Ellen van Dijk
Stage 3, Ellen van Dijk
Stages 1 & 5 BrainWash Ladies Tour, Ina-Yoko Teutenberg
Stage 2 BrainWash Ladies Tour, Ellen van Dijk, Ina-Yoko Teutenberg, Trixi Worrack, Evelyn Stevens, Amber Neben, Charlotte Becker
Chrono des Nations, Amber Neben

2013

Le Samyn des Dames, Ellen van Dijk
 Overall Energiewacht Tour, Ellen van Dijk
Stage 3a Ellen van Dijk
Omloop van Borsele ITT, Ellen van Dijk
 Overall Gracia–Orlová, Ellen van Dijk
 Points classification, Ellen van Dijk
Team classification
Prologue, Stages 2 & 4, Ellen van Dijk
Stage 1, Evelyn Stevens
Stage 5, Loren Rowney
Stage 4 Tour Languedoc Roussillon, Loren Rowney
Chrono Gatineau, Carmen Small
Stage 5 (ITT) Tour Languedoc Roussillon, Lisa Brennauer
Stage 6 Tour Languedoc Roussillon, Gillian Carleton
Philadelphia Cycling Classic, Evelyn Stevens
 Overall  Giro del Trentino Alto Adige-Südtirol, Evelyn Stevens
Stage 1b, Evelyn Stevens
Stage 8 (ITT) Giro Rosa, Ellen van Dijk
Stage 2 Thüringen Rundfahrt der Frauen, Carmen Small
Open de Suède Vårgårda TTT
 Overall Lotto–Belisol Belgium Tour, Ellen van Dijk
Stage 1 (TTT)
 Overall Boels Rental Ladies Tour, Ellen van Dijk
Stage 2 (TTT)

2014

Drentse 8 van Dwingeloo, Chantal Blaak
Team classification Energiewacht Tour
Stage 3b (TTT)
Stage 5, Chantal Blaak
Ronde van Overijssel, Lisa Brennauer
Women's Tour of California circuit race, Carmen Small
GP Leende TT, Lisa Brennauer
 Overall Auensteiner-Radsporttage, Lisa Brennauer
Teams classification, Lisa Brennauer
Stages 1 & 2, Lisa Brennauer
The Philadelphia Cycling Classic, Evelyn Stevens
Chrono Gatineau, Tayler Wiles
Overall  North Star Grand Prix, Carmen Small
Stage 3, Carmen Small
 Overall Internationale Thüringen Rundfahrt der Frauen, Evelyn Stevens
 German rider classification, Lisa Brennauer
Teams classification
 Active rider award Stage 2, Evelyn Stevens
Prologue & Stage 3, Lisa Brennauer
Stage 4, Evelyn Stevens
Open de Suède Vårgårda TTT
Open de Suède Vårgårda, Chantal Blaak
 Overall Boels Rental Ladies Tour, Evelyn Stevens
 Points classification, Lisa Brennauer
Teams classification
Stage 2 Lisa Brennauer
Stage 3 Tour Cycliste Féminin International de l'Ardèche, Loren Rowney

2015

 Overall Energiewacht Tour, Lisa Brennauer
Stage 2a, Team time trial
Dwars door de Westhoek, Élise Delzenne
 Overall Gracia–Orlová, Alena Amialiusik
Stage 1, Alena Amialiusik
Stage 3 (ITT), Lisa Brennauer
Stage 4, Karol-Ann Canuel
Stage 5, Élise Delzenne
 Overall Tour of California, Trixi Worrack
Winston-Salem Cycling Classic, Alena Amialiusik
European Games road race, Alena Amialiusik
 Overall The Women's Tour, Lisa Brennauer
Stage 4, Lisa Brennauer
Stage 1 Giro d'Italia, Barbara Guarischi
Mountains classification Thüringen Rundfahrt der Frauen, Élise Delzenne
Stages 1 & 3 (ITT), Lisa Brennauer
Stage 7, Karol-Ann Canuel
Stage 4 La Route de France, Loren Rowney

References

T-Mobile (women's team)
Wins
Women's sport-related lists